Robert Rich may refer to:
Robert Rich, 1st Earl of Warwick (1559–1619), English nobleman
Robert Rich, 2nd Earl of Warwick (1587–1658), English naval officer and politician
Robert Rich, 3rd Earl of Warwick (1611–1659)
Sir Robert Rich, 2nd Baronet (c. 1648–1699), English Member of Parliament and a Lord of the Admiralty
Sir Robert Rich, 4th Baronet (1685–1768), British field marshal
Sir Robert Rich, 5th Baronet (1717–1785), British general
Robert E. Rich Sr. (1913–2006), inventor of non-dairy whipped topping, founder of Rich Products
Robert E. Rich Jr. (born 1941), chairman of Rich Products Corporation
Robert E. Rich (born 1926), American intelligence official
Robert F. Rich (1883–1968), politician from Pennsylvania
Robert G. Rich Jr. (born 1930), U.S. Ambassador to Belize
Robert Rich (musician) (born 1963), American ambient musician
Robert Rich, pen name used by American screenwriter and novelist Dalton Trumbo (1905–1976) because of blacklisting